According to The Economist Group's Democracy Index 2020 study, Israel is the only democratic country (qualified as a "flawed democracy", ranked #28 worldwide) in the Middle East, while Tunisia (#53 worldwide) is the only democracy (also "flawed democracy") in North Africa. The level of democracy in nations throughout the world published by Freedom House, a U.S.-based, U.S. government-funded advocacy organization, and in various other freedom indices, report the Middle Eastern and North African countries with the highest scores are Israel, Tunisia, Turkey, Lebanon, Morocco, Jordan and Kuwait. Countries that have been consistently labelled as 'not free' by Freedom House (2017-2021) have been Iran, Iraq and Egypt. They have been increasingly becoming more and more adverse to the idea of  liberal democracy with their scores steadily decreasing, only Iraq out of these countries have maintained some level of internet freedom with a (partly free) score of 41/100. The remaining countries of the Middle East are categorised as authoritarian regimes, with the lowest scores held by Saudi Arabia and Yemen.

Freedom House categories Israel and Tunisia as "Free". As a result, Tunisia is the only country in North Africa classified as "Free" by the Freedom House organization. Lebanon, Kuwait and Morocco "Partly Free", and the remaining states as "Not Free" (including Western Sahara, which is largely controlled by Morocco). Events of the "Arab Spring" such as the Tunisian Revolution may indicate a move towards democracy in some countries which may not be fully captured in the democracy index. In 2015, Tunisia became the first Arab country classified as free since the beginning of Lebanon's civil war 40 years ago. 
Theories are diverse on the subject. "Revisionist theories" argue that democracy is slightly incompatible with Middle Eastern values. On the other hand, "post-colonial" theories (such as those put forth by Edward Said) for the relative absence of liberal democracy in the Middle East are diverse, from the long history of imperial rule by the Ottoman Empire, United Kingdom and France and the contemporary political and military intervention by the United States, all of which have been blamed for preferring authoritarian regimes because this ostensibly simplifies the business environment, while enriching the governing elite and the companies of the imperial countries. Other explanations include the problem that most of the states in the region are rentier states, which experience the theorised resource curse.

This article follows sources that place Cyprus in Europe, not the Middle East.

History
The decline and fall of the Ottoman Empire set the stage for nationalist movements to emerge in Southwest Asia and North Africa as the Second French Empire, the Italian Empire, and British Empire began to target and colonize the region. The century between 1820 and 1920 saw the Ottoman Empire shrink from encompassing the entirety of the Levant and Egypt, the Balkans, and significant portions of the coastal Maghreb and Arabian Peninsula, to less than half of the modern state of Turkey. During this period, nationalist movements began in reaction to both the spread of nationalism throughout Europe and to European colonial incursion prior to the Ottoman Empire's collapse.

Following the conclusion of World War I in 1918 and the fall of the Ottoman Empire in 1922, many former Ottoman territories not already under European control were colonized by European countries via League of Nations mandates. While European powers were instrumental in establishing the first independent governments that emerged from the Ottoman Empire, the mandatory period was brief, primarily spanning the interwar period and World War II. Interest in national self-determination further increased during the mandatory period, and accelerated as the process of decolonization began in the region following the end of World War II in 1948.

During decolonization, current and formerly colonized peoples of Southwest Asia, North Africa, and the horn of Africa grappled with significant political and economic upheaval, both internally and in response to neocolonialism from Western nations. Early Arab nationalism involved transforming ethnically diverse communities coping with the effects of experiencing imperial collapse, colonization, and decolonization in under a century, into a unitary national identity. For most of these emergent countries, democratic statehood was either out of reach due to political instability, or rejected in favor of other forms of government.

During the Cold War, the United States of America and the Soviet Union competed for allies in Southwest Asia and North Africa, and the United States has been accused of supporting dictatorships contrary to its stated democratic principles. The 1957 Eisenhower Doctrine was the beginning of a policy of American democracy promotion in the Middle East and North Africa, leading, for example, to American intervention on behalf of the democratically elected government in the 1958 Lebanon crisis.

Following the terrorist attacks of September 11, 2001, the U.S. war in Afghanistan and Iraq War represented a significant turning point for the United States' shift in foreign policy in the Muslim world. Although protests against the Iraq War in particular widely criticized American intervention as a form of neocolonialism, American political rhetoric during the Afghanistan and Iraq wars centered on the purpose of the wars being to bring democratization in the region, as the invasions of those countries were partly for purposes of organizing democratic governments.

Opponents of American intervention in Afghanistan and Iraq have, however, criticized that democracy cannot be imposed from outside. The two countries have since had relatively successful elections, but have also experienced serious security and development problems.

Some believe that democracy can be established "only through force" and the help of the United States. Writers such as Michele Dunne, when writing for the Carnegie Paper concurs with the rhetoric of the late Israeli prime minister Yitzhak Rabin (at that time, referring to peace and terrorism) that the foreign policy position of the US should be to 'pursue peace as though there were no democratization, and pursue democratization as though there were no peace. In other words, the U.S. government should pursue reform and democratization as policy goals in the first instance without worrying excessively about tradeoffs with other goals."  The U.S. pressure behind the calling of the 2006 Palestinian legislative election backfired, resulting in the democratically sound victory of Hamas, rather than the US-supported Fatah.  Drawing upon the ideas of Middle East scholar Nicola Pratt it can be argued that:

…the outcome of democratization efforts is [in reality]…contingent upon the degree to which actors' chosen strategies contribute to either reproducing or challenging the relations of power between civil society and the state.

However, recent academic critics have characterized intervention in the Middle East as a means towards engendering democracy a failure. The 2011 study Costs of War from Brown University's Watson Institute for International Studies concluded that democracy promotion has been flawed from the beginning in both Iraq and Afghanistan, with corruption rampant in both countries as the United States prepares to withdraw many of its combat troops. On a scale of democratization established by Transparency International, Iraq and Afghanistan are two of the worst-ranked countries in the world, surpassed in corruption by only Myanmar and Somalia.

Measures of democracy

There are several non-governmental organizations that publish and maintain indices of democracy in the world, according to their own various definitions of the term, and rank countries as being free, partly free, or unfree using various measures of freedom, including political rights, economic rights, freedom of the press and civil liberties.

V-Dem Democracy indices 
The table below shows how countries score on the 11th edition of the V-Dem Democracy indices in 2020.

Freedom House assessment

An analysis on the level of constitution around the world is conducted every year by Freedom House. Freedom House analyses political rights (PR), civil liberties (CL) and overall regime status. PR and CL are rated from one to seven, with one being most free and seven being least free. Regimes are classed as either 'free, partly free or not free'.

The below table summarizes the findings of the 2010 - 2015 Freedom in the World report on the countries of the Middle East and North Africa.

Key: * - Electoral democracies (as described above), PR - Political Rights, CL - Civil Liberties, Free Status: Free, Partly Free, Not Free

Current state
There are a number of pro-democracy movements in the Middle East. A prominent figure in this movement is Saad Eddin Ibrahim who advocates and campaigns for democracy in Egypt and the wider region, working with the Ibn Khaldun Centre for Development Studies and serving on the Board of Advisors for the Project on Middle East Democracy.

When asked about his thoughts regarding the current state of democracy in the region he said:

The Middle East Forum, a think tank based in Philadelphia, recently published their table for measurement of democracy within Middle Eastern states. Their contention is that little has changed, post-September 11, 2001, and if anything the "War on Terror" has enabled many regimes to stifle democratic progress. The results showed very little progress from 1999 to 2005. The report even states that this pattern may be counter-productive to US interests, with Islamism being the only viable opposition to regimes in many Middle Eastern countries. As an additional measure of US attitudes towards the issue of Middle Eastern democratization, on 14 December 2006, the US Secretary of state Condoleezza Rice stated that democracy in the Middle East was "non-negotiable."

Middle East scholar Louise Fawcett notes how the United Nations Development Programme's Arab Human Development Report 2002, drafted by Western-educated Arab intellectuals, is modelled "on universal democratic principles." In addition, Fawcett argues that "Constitutional democracy is viewed not only as an intrinsic good by the putative globalisers who drafted this Report; it is also an instrumental necessity if the region is to stop stagnating and begin to catch up with the rest of the world."

The level of democratic process varies widely from country to country.  A few countries, such as Saudi Arabia, do not claim to be democracies; however, most of the larger states claim to be democracies, although this claim is in most cases disputed.

Presidential republics

A number of republics embracing Arab Socialism, such as Syria and Egypt, regularly hold elections, but critics assert that these are not full multi-party systems. Most importantly they do not allow citizens to choose between multiple candidates for the presidential election. The constitution of modern Egypt has always given the president a virtual monopoly over the decision-making process, devoting 30 articles (15 percent of the whole constitution) to presidential prerogatives. According to the constitution, the Egyptian president's powers are equivalent to those of the prime minister in parliamentary systems and to the president of the French Fifth Republic. Yemen, Lebanon and the Palestinian Authority, while also partly accepting this ideology, are generally considered more democratic than other states that do so, but the power of institutions in the latter two are limited by the domination of Syria and Israel, respectively.

Absolute monarchy

Absolute monarchy is common in the Middle East. Saudi Arabia and a few other kingdoms on the Arabian Peninsula are considered absolute monarchies. The endurance of authoritarian regimes in the Middle East is notable in comparison to the rest of the world. While such regimes have fallen throughout sub-Saharan Africa, for example, they have persisted in the Middle East. Yet Middle Eastern history also includes significant episodes of conflict between rulers and proponents of change.

Constitutional monarchy
Constitutional monarchy is a form of government in which a monarch acts as head of state within the guidelines of a constitution, whether it be a written, uncodified, or blended constitution. This form of government differs from absolute monarchy in which an absolute monarch serves as the source of power in the state and is not legally bound by any constitution and has the powers to regulate his or her respective government.

Most constitutional monarchies employ a parliamentary system in which the monarch may have strictly ceremonial duties or may have reserve powers, depending on the constitution. Under most modern constitutional monarchies there is also a prime minister who is the head of government and exercises effective political power. The Middle Eastern countries with Constitutional monarchies are generally considered democratic. For example: Jordan, Kuwait, Morocco, and Bahrain are considered constitutional monarchies.

Islamic governments
The Iranian Revolution of 1979 resulted in an electoral system (an Islamic Republic with a constitution), but the system has a limited democracy in practice. One of the main problems of Iran's system is the consolidation of power in the hands of the Supreme Leader who is elected by Assembly of Experts for life (unless the Assembly of Experts decides to remove him which has never happened). Another main problem is the closed loop in the electoral system, the elected Assembly of Experts elect the Supreme Leader of Iran, who appoints the members of the Guardian Council, who in turn vet the candidates for all elections including the elections for Assembly of Experts. However, some elections in Iran, as the election of city councils satisfies free and democratic election criteria to some extent. In other countries, the ideology (usually out of power) has fostered both pro-democratic and anti-democratic sentiments. The Justice and Development Party is a moderate democratic Islamist party that has come to power in traditionally secular Turkey. Its moderate ideology has been compared to Christian Democracy in Europe. The United Iraqi Alliance, the winner of the recent elections in Iraq, is a coalition including many religious parties. In the book "Islam and Democracy - A Historial Overivew", the author Bernard Lewis draws the comparison of increased democritisation and draws attention to the country embracing liberal demcoracy values. This has been seen recently with the 2022 protests in Iran, sometimes referred to as the Mahsa Amini protests which have come about after opposition to extreme Islamic law in the country, limited freedom of expression and violation of women's rights. They started when Mahsa Amini was executed by the state, and has seen solidarity across some Islamic countries as well as professional Irianian footballers in the 2022 world cup, where they refused to sing their national anthem to draw attention to the protests.

Iran

History of political systems
Historically Iranians were ruled by an absolute monarchy for several thousand years, at least since the time of the Achaemenid Empire (550 B.C.E.) until the Constitutional Revolution in the early 20th century. The Constitutional Revolution in 1906 replaced the absolute monarchy with a constitutional monarchy. The constitution went under several revisions during the following decades. During World War II Iran stayed neutral but in 1941 the Allies (the USSR and Great Britain) invaded Iran and replaced Iran's Shah Reza Pahlavi (who was perceived as being pro-German) with his son Mohammad Reza Pahlavi to protect their access to Iranian oil, and to secure routes to ship western military aid to the Soviet Union. Iran's parliamentary government led by Prime Minister Mohammed Mosaddeq was toppled in a 1953 coup d'état by royalist forces supported and funded by CIA and MI6 after Mohammed Mosaddeq nationalized Iranian oil. Shah Mohammad Reza Pahlavi became the preeminent leader in Iran, and instated Fazlollah Zahedi from the military as the new Prime Minister. United States has considered the Shah as a close ally and Iran as its main base in the Middle East. The Shah also tried to modernize Iran's economy and westernize Iran's culture. These and other policies contributed to alienating nationalists, leftists, and religious groups.

The monarchy was overthrown in 1979 by the Iranian Revolution. In the same year a referendum was held by Ruhollah Khomeini, that asked whether there should be an 'Islamic Republic' or not. The 1979 referendum (in favor of an Islamic Republic) got 98% support of those who voted. The constitution was modeled on the 1958 constitution of the French Fifth Republic by the Assembly of Experts for Constitution (who were elected by direct popular vote) and Khomeini made himself the new Supreme Leader of Iran. The constitution received above 99% support in another 1979 referendum. After Khomeini's death, the Assembly of Experts (which is made of Islamic scholars elected by direct vote) appointed Ali Khamenei as the new Supreme Leader. The constitution was also amended through a referendum in 1989 with 97% support a few months before Ayatollah Ruhollah Khomeini died increasing the powers of Supreme Leader. Iran holds regular national elections by universal suffrage for all citizens (regardless of race, religion, or sex, who are of voting age) for electing the President, members of Parliament, Assembly of Experts, City and Village Councils where political parties support candidates.

Issues with the current political system

The current political system in Iran was designed to allow Iranians to decide their future by themselves without being oppressed by authorities, but in practice only allows a limited democracy. One of the main problems of Iran's system is the consolidation of too much power in the hands of the Supreme Leader who is elected by the Assembly of Experts for life (unless the Assembly of Experts decides to remove him, which has never happened). The power of the Supreme Leader under Iran's constitution is almost unlimited and unrestricted in practice. This combined with the view that he is the representative of God held by some religious groups, being the head of the security and armed forces, and controlling the official state media (the radio and television are restricted to state radio and television) makes him immune from any kind of criticism and unchallengeable. Critics of the system or the Supreme Leader are punished severely. Critical newspapers and political parties are closed, social and political activists like writers, journalists, human right activists, university students, union leaders, lawyers, and politicians are jailed for unreasonably long periods for making simple criticism against the Supreme Leader, the Islamic Republic system, Islam and Shia doctrines, the government, and other officials. They have been even threatened by death sentence (though all such verdict in recent years have been dropped in higher courts in recent years) and some have been assassinated by the Ministry of Intelligence and militias in the past (no such case has been reported in recent years).

Another main problem is the closed loop in the electoral system, the elected Assembly of Experts elects the Supreme Leader, so in theory he is elected indirectly by popular vote, but in practice the system does not satisfy the criteria for a free election since the Supreme Leader appoints the members of the Guardian Council who in turn vet the candidates for all elections including the elections for Assembly of Experts. This loop limits the possible candidates to those agreeing with the views held by Supreme Leader and he has the final say over all important issues.

Also, the fourth unchangeable article of constitution states that all other articles of the constitution and all other laws are void if they violate Islamic rules, and the Guardian Council is given the duty of interpreting the constitution and verifying that all laws passed the parliament are not against Islamic laws. Many articles of constitution about political freedoms and minority rights (e.g. education in mother language for language minorities) have not been applied at all.

Other problems include the issues with the rights of racial and religious minorities, influence and involvement of armed forces especially the Islamic Revolutionary Guard Corps and Basij in political activities, widespread corruption in the ruling elite, problems with security forces like police and militias like Ansar-e Hezbollah, and corruption in Judiciary.

Public opinion of Iranians regarding the political system of 2011–2012
Polls in 2011 and 2012 in Iran by a number of respected Western polling organizations showed that a considerable majority of Iranians supported the system, including the religious institutions, and trusted the system's handling of elections (including the disputed presidential elections in 2009). Some Iranians and political activists dispute the results of these polls arguing that the results of these polls cannot be trusted because people fear to express their real opinion and the limitations on the follow of information allows the state to control the opinion of people living in more traditional parts of the country. Some of these polling organizations have responded to these claims and defended their results as correctly showing the current opinion of Iranians. The polls also showed a divide between the population living in large modern cities like Tehran and people living in other more traditional and conservative parts of the country like rural areas and smaller cities.

Lebanon
Lebanon has traditionally enjoyed a confessional democratic system. The Lebanese constitution, doctored in 1926, was based on the French constitution and guaranteed liberty and equality for all its citizens. A large number of political parties with very different ideologies, are active in Lebanon, but most of them form political alliances with other groups of similar interests. Even though certain high-profile positions in the government and the seats in the parliament are reserved for specified sects, intense competition is usually expected of political parties and candidates.

In January 2015, the Economist Intelligence Unit, released a report stating that Lebanon ranked the 2nd in Middle East and 98th out of 167 countries worldwide for Democracy Index 2014, which ranks countries according to election processes, pluralism, government functions, political participation, political cultures and fundamental freedoms.

Israel 
Israel is a parliamentary democracy represented by a large number of parties, with universal suffrage for all citizens, regardless of race, religion, sex, or sexual orientation, who are of voting age. Often recognized as the only functional democracy in Arabia and the Middle East, Israel has thrived since 1948 under an elective government and the leadership of prime ministers such as its inaugural, Ben Gurion and its current Yair Lapid.

Palestine 

Prior to the mass immigration of Israeli citizens to the region and the two-state solution there was no formal government or authority in the land known as Palestine. Society operated without a democracy, monarchy or dictatorship; merely a conglomerate of tribes, clans, villages and communities headed by a select few elders known as "Sheikhs" also transliterated Sheik, Sheyikh, Shaykh, Shayk, Cheikh, Shekh, Shaik and Shaikh. The two state solution drastically altered this and effectively displaced an overwhelming amount of Palestinians. As a result, the semi-political organization, Palestinian Liberation Organization (PLO) was formed. Yasser Arafat served as chairman of the Palestine Liberation Organization from 1969 to 2004 and is considered one of the most influential Palestinian leaders.

Arab Spring

The protests, uprisings and revolutions in the Middle East and North Africa, beginning on 18 December 2010, brought about the overthrow of the Tunisian and Egyptian governments. Libya was brought into a 6-month civil war which brought about the end of Gaddafi's 41-year rule. Bahrain and Yemen experienced uprisings. The uprising in Syria led to full-scale civil war. Tunisia and Egypt have held elections that were considered fair by observers. Mohamed Morsi was sworn in as Egypt's first president to gain power through an election on 30 June 2012; however, after protests against him in June 2013, as well as a 48-hour deadline by the Egyptian Armed Forces to respond to the protesters' demands that he did not comply with, Morsi was removed from office in July 2013. Morsi's Defence Minister, Abdel Fattah el-Sisi, who served as a general in the Egyptian Armed Forces at the time, was responsible for announcing the overthrow on state television. Many other countries in the region are also calling for democracy and freedom, including: Algeria, Armenia, Azerbaijan, Djibouti, Iran, Iraq, Jordan, Oman, Yemen, Kuwait, Mauritania, Morocco, Saudi Arabia, Sudan and Turkey. Research confirms that (in general) people in Islamic societies support democracy.

Secularism

Secularism in the Middle East was pioneered by Mustafa Kemal Atatürk, who, though he himself had some authoritarian tendencies, helped establish the first modern Middle Eastern secular democracy in Turkey.  Arab Socialism has also fostered secularism, though sometimes in what has been seen as a less democratic context.  Secularism is not the same as freedom of religion, and secular governments have at times denied the rights of Islamists and other religious parties. This is essentially why Mustafa Kemal Atatürk was such a polarizing figure among the Turks. Though he was a Muslim by name, the authoritarian decisions he made in the name of secularism tended to deviate from Islamic tradition. As a result, a trend of a more liberal secularism supporting broader freedom of religion has developed recently in Turkey, while some Arab Socialist states have moved away from secularism to some extent, increasingly embracing religion, though many say without really increasing the rights of religious parties.

The state, democratization and the Middle East
The reasons for the lack of democratization in the Middle East are outlined by analysts such as Albrecht Schnabel, who says that a strong civil society is required to produce leaders and mobilize the public around democratic duties, but in order for such a civil society to flourish, a democratic environment and process allowing freedom of expression and order is required in the first place. This theory, therefore, supports the intervention of outside countries, such as the U.S., in establishing democracy. "If domestic capacities are lacking, external support may be required.  Externally supported creation of fragile, yet somewhat functioning institutions is meant to trigger the momentum needed to encourage the evolution of a functioning civil society.  The latter will, after a few years of consolidation and post-conflict stability, produce the first wholly internally crafted government.  At that time, external involvement, if still provided at that point, can cede." Schnabel argues that democratization in the Middle East must come from both below and above, given that pressure from below will be pointless if the political leadership is opposed to reform, while top-down reform (which has been the norm in the Middle East) is not a fruitful endeavor if the political culture in society is not developed.

Other analysts draw different conclusions. Drawing from the work of Alexis de Tocqueville and Robert Putnam, these researchers suggest that independent, nongovernmental associations help foster a participatory form of governance. They cite the lack of horizontal voluntary association as a reason for the persistence of authoritarianism in the region. Other analysts believe that the lack of a market-driven economy in many Middle Eastern countries undermines the capacity to build the kind of individual autonomy and power that helps promote democracy.

Therefore, the relationship of the state to civil society is one of the most important indicators of the chances of democracy evolving in a particular country. Poverty, inequality, and low literacy rates also compromise people's commitment to democratic reforms since survival becomes a higher priority.  Some analysts point to MENA's saturation with Islam as an explanation for the region's failure to democratize.

Other analysts believe that the failure of democratization results from the power of the state.  Inspired by Skopcol's work on revolution, Belin argues that democratic transition can only be carried out when the state's coercive apparatus lacks the will or capacity to crush opponents. Authoritarianism has been exceptionally robust in the MENA region because many of the states have proven willing and able to crush reform initiatives. Moreover, almost every Arab state has been directly involved in some form of international conflict over the past decades. Research suggests that conflict involvement has a direct influence on the country's prospects for democratization.

However, critics of these theories observe that some countries which experience many of these democracy-inhibiting factors are successful in their quest for democratization.

See also
Human rights in the Middle East
Human trafficking in the Middle East
LGBT in the Middle East
Islam and modernity
Middle East and globalization
Women in the Arab world
United States foreign policy in the Middle East
American democracy promotion in the Middle East and North Africa
Freedom in the World
List of freedom indices

References

External links

 Marina Ottoway, et al., "Democratic Mirage in the Middle East", Carnegie Endowment for Ethics and International Peace, Policy Brief 20 (October 20, 2002).
 Marina Ottoway and Thomas Carothers, "Think Again: Middle East Democracy", Foreign Policy (Nov./Dec. 2004).
 Adnan M. Hayajneh, "The U.S. Strategy: Democracy and Internal Stability in the Arab World", Alternatives (Volume 3, No. 2 & 3, Summer/Fall 2004).
 Democracy in Yemen
 Gary Gambill, "Jumpstarting Arab Reform: The Bush Administration's Greater Middle East Initiative", Middle East Intelligence Bulletin (Vol. 6, No. 6-7, June/July 2004).
 Remarks by George W. Bush at the 20th Anniversary of the National Endowment for Democracy, United States Chamber of Commerce, Washington, D.C., "President Bush Discusses Freedom in Iraq and Middle East", (6 November 2003).
 Robert Blecher, "Free People Will Set the Course of History: Intellectuals, Democracy and American Empire", Middle East Report (March 2003).
 Robert Fisk, "What Does Democracy Really Mean In The Middle East? Whatever The West Decides", The London Independent (8 August 2005).
Fawaz Gergez, "Is Democracy in the Middle East a Pipedream?", Yale Global Online (April 25, 2005).
Adam Garfinkle, Joshua Muravchik, Jon Alterman, Michele Dunne, J. Scott Carpenter, "Can the Middle East Sustain Democracy?", Middle East Strategy at Harvard (January 3, 2008).

Arab Spring
Middle East
Politics of the Middle East